is a masculine Japanese given name.

Possible writings 
Takahito can be written using different kanji characters and can mean:

 , "Preciousness, nobility" and "Benevolence, compassion"
 , "Nobori, banner" and "Benevolence, compassion"
 , "Worship, admiration" and "Benevolence, compassion"
 , "Lord, goddess" and "Benevolence, compassion"
 , "Greater, further" and "Benevolence, compassion"
 , "Worship, admiration" and "Person, human beings"
 , "Prosperity, flourishing" and "Person, human beings"
 , "Lord, goddess" and "Person, human beings"
 , "Lord, goddess" and "Warrior, samurai"
 , "Lord, goddess" and "Imperial"

The name can also be written in hiragana or katakana.

Notable people with the name 
 , later , 71st emperor of Japan
 , Japanese technology entrepreneur and real estate investor
 , 4th and youngest son of Emperor Taishō of Japan
 , 8th head of the Arisugawa-no-miya house, one of the shinnōke branches of the Imperial Family of Japan
 , Japanese football player
 , Japanese major-league baseball player
 , Japanese former professional baseball pitcher
 , Japanese Nippon Professional Baseball player
 , Japanese professional ice hockey player
, Japanese footballer
, Japanese figure skater
, Japanese kickboxer
, Japanese video game composer

References 

Japanese masculine given names
Japanese people
Japanese names
Given names